Frank Sanguinetti (5 May 1886 – 27 July 1973) was an Australian rules footballer who played with Richmond in the Victorian Football League (VFL).

Family
The son of tailor John Francis Sanguinetti (1862-1917), and dressmaker Emily Purthynia Sanguinetti (1862-1902), née Williams, Frank Sanguinetti was born at Collingwood, Victoria on 5 May 1886.

He married Edith Jane Allen (1890-1972) in 1912. They had six children.

Football
After a single senior game with Richmond against Carlton at the Punt Road Oval on 15 August 1908, the second last match of Richmond's first VFL season, Sanguinetti returned to Collingwood Districts in 1909 where he played until 1913.

Death
Having spent his life employed as a tailor, he died at Camberwell, Victoria on 27 July 1973.

Notes

References
 This Collingwood Life: Frank Sanguinetti: From Italian Migrants to Five Generations of Magpie fans, colingwoodfc.com.au.
 Hogan P: The Tigers of Old, Richmond FC, (Melbourne), 1996. 
 Holmesby, Russell & Main, Jim (2014), The Encyclopedia of AFL Footballers: Every AFL/VFL player since 1897 (10th ed.), Seaford, Victoria: BAS Publishing.

External links 

Frank Sanguinetti's profile at Tigerland Archive 

1886 births
1973 deaths
Australian rules footballers from Victoria (Australia)
Richmond Football Club players